The College of Arts and Letters is the oldest and largest college within the University of Notre Dame. The Dean of the College of Arts and Letters is Sarah Mustillo.

History

The College of Arts and Letters is the oldest in the university, and it was founded in 1842 with the University itself.

Facilities
The main center of the College is O'Shaughnessy Hall, which hosts classrooms, art galleries, a coffee shop, and administrative offices. It was built in 1953 by Ellerbe Associates in Tudor Gothic style. Ground was broken for in July 1951 and the cornerstone was laid in May,  The wings of the building meet at a central six-story tower. In addition to classrooms, the building also featured music rooms and 4 art galleries, which were later incorporated into the Snite Museum of Art. The high-beam decorated ceiling was painted by Alphonse Schmitt. The building was the gift of philanthropist Ignatius Aloysius O'Shaughnessy and cost $2,300,000. O'Shaughnessy was an oil tycoon and philanthropist; he was made Knight Commander Order of St. Gregory on June 17th 1958 by Pius XII, Pope Paul VI made him papal count in 1967, and the National Conference of Christians and Jews bestowed upon him its Brotherhood Award in 1971. Its Great Hall, which is decorated and sculpted on the outside, features a crucifix by Croatian sculptor Ivan Meštrović, a bust of Dean Charles E. Sheedy, and 7 stained glass windows, representing the seven liberal arts. The Great Hall also hosts two tapestries that were rediscovered and restored in 2014 when the Hall was restored to its original appearance. One tapestry is of German or Belgian production from the 17th century, while the other one is from 18th century France. It was featured in the movie Rudy. Offices for most of the faculty of the College are housed in Decio and Malloy Halls, which are situated just West of O'Shaughnessy Hall.

Corbett Family Hall, which is part of the Campus Crossroads expansion of the Notre Dame Stadium, houses the Departments of Anthropology and Psychology. Corbett is a 280,000-square-foot building, and is located on the East side of the stadium, between the Dan Devine (Gate A) and Ara Parseghian (Gate B) gates, facing the Edmund P. Joyce Center. The second floor houses the Department of Anthropology, with research laboratories, offices, study and meeting rooms, classrooms, and social events spaces . The third, fourth, and fifth floors house the Department of Psychology's offices, more than 30 research labs, and classrooms. The third floor is mostly cognitive psychology, the fourth floor is mainly behavioral psychology, and the fifth floor is mainly a mixture of relationship psychology and others. The anthropology and psychology departments, both in the College of Arts and Letters, were scattered around campus and without a single location before the opening of Corbett.

The departments of Art and Art History, and Design is housed in the Leo and Edna Riley Hall of Art & Design. The building, which built in 1917 as a chemistry hall, was renovated in 1982 thanks to a donation from Allan Riley, real estate investor and 1957 graduate. The department also houses its graphic and industrial design programs in the recently renovated West Lake hall. The Department of Film, Television, and Theatre is housed and has its performance and recital spaces in the DeBartolo Performing Arts Center, in addition to using several other facilities such as Washington Hall and the Martin Media Center in Corbett Hall and others. The Departments of Philosophy and Theology are housed in Malloy Hall.

The Music department is housed in O'Neill Hall, also part of the Campus Crossroads project and on the Notre Dame Stadium. The fifth and sixths floors of O'Neill Hall are dedicated to the Sacred Music Program and house departmental offices, teaching studios and practice rooms. The third floor hosts the Michuda Family Visiting Artist Rehearsal Hall as well as seminar rooms, two mid-sized classrooms, and large lecture hall, and the music library, which was relocated from the Hesburgh Library. The first floor also hosts LaBar Family Performance and Rehearsal Hall, both 2,200-square-feet. The recital hall has 175 seats, offering a more intimate atmosphere than other spaces on campus. It features a traditional stage, fixed seating, and a formal atmosphere for classical concert music. The Performance Hall instead is more an interdisciplinary performance space, accommodating alternative types of musical events in combination with other media, such as projected text visual images, acting, lighting, and dance. It has flexible seating and staging options in a “black-box” style setting that can host avant-garde performance and experimentation.

Departments
The Humanities
Africana Studies
American Studies (includes journalism)
Classics (includes Arabic Studies)
East Asian Languages and Cultures
English
German and Russian Languages and Literatures
History
Irish Language and Literature
Philosophy
Program of Liberal Studies
Romance Languages and Literatures
Theology

The Arts
Art, Art History & Design
Film, Television, and Theatre
Music
The Social Sciences
Anthropology
Economics
Political Science
Psychology
Sociology

Centers, Institutes, and Affiliations

The Center for Social Concerns 
The College of Arts and letters is also affiliated with the Notre Dame Center for Social Concerns, which studies poverty, injustice, and oppression.

Keough-Naughton Institute for Irish Studies
Established in 1991 with a gift from Donald Keough, the institute focused on the study of Ireland and Irish culture, language, immigration, and history. In 2006 it was renamed after a further donation from Irish businessman Martin Naughton. At the undergraduate level, it offers many courses and a minor in Irish Studies. It also offers a minor for Ph.D. students of English or History. The institute is located of the University's Global gateway in Dublin, which is based at O'Connell House, a late eighteenth-century building on Merrion Square, which enables students to study abroad in Ireland. The institute also runs Irish internships which offer Dublin-based summer positions. In the summer, the Institute hosts The IRISH Seminar, a weeks-long seminar that focuses on Irish cultural, intellectual, and political debates.

Medieval Institute
The College of Arts and Letters is affiliated with the Notre Dame Medieval Institute, that is regarded among the best centers for Medieval Studies. It is ranked number #6 by U.S. News & World Report. 
The institute was formally founded in 1946, but it was created on a pre-existing program of medieval studies that dated back to the 1930s. Its rare book collection contains holds microfilms and photographic copies of nearly all of the Latin and vernacular materials and many of those in Greek, Hebrew, and Arabic housed in the great Biblioteca Ambrosiana in Milan. This collection was conceived in 1960, when the Archbishop of Milan, Cardinal Giovanni Montini (future Pope Paul VI) visited campus for an honorary degree. Starting in 1962, the library acquired microfilm of over 35,000 manuscripts. Additionally, the institute's collection also features the Astrik L. Gabriel Universities Collection, which collects book, journals, and other sources on the histories of universities worldwide.

Eck Institute for Global Health 
A university-wide enterprise, the Eck Institute for Global Health (EIGH) promotes research, training, and service to advance health standards and reduce health disparities. The EIGH includes epidemiology, Molecular biology and microbiology, Computational science, Maternal, child, and community health, Genetics and genomics, Biochemistry, Non-communicable diseases, Social sciences.

Institute for Educational Initiatives 
The Notre Dame Institute for Educational Initiatives was founded in 1996 under the direction of Prof. Maureen Hallinan.

Institute for Latino Studies 
Created in 1999, the Institute for Latino Studies focuses on understanding of the U.S. Latino experience. Building upon the history of Latinos at Notre Dame and the legacy of Julian Samora, a pioneering Latino scholar and professor of sociology, the Institute supports scholarly initiatives in Latino studies.

Kroc Institute for International Peace Studies 
The University of Notre Dame’s Kroc Institute for International Peace Studies is a center for the study of the causes of violent conflict and strategies for sustainable peace. Kroc institute faculty and fellows conduct interdisciplinary research on topics related to peace and justice. The Kroc Institute offers  an undergraduate program, a master’s in International Peace Studies, and a Ph.D program. It was founded in 1986 through the donations of Joan B. Kroc, the widow of McDonald's founder Ray Kroc. The institute was inspired by the vision of Rev. Theodore M. Hesburgh CSC, President Emeritus of the University of Notre Dame. The institute has contributed to international policy discussions about peace building practices, including the Colombian peace process.

Liu Institute for Asia and Asian Studies 
The Institute provides a forum for integrated and multidisciplinary research and teaching on Asia. The Institute promotes awareness, understanding, and knowledge of Asia through organizing public events.

Research Centers and Affiliations 
In addition to its affiliations with Interdisciplinary institutes, faculty, graduate, and undergraduate students in the College of Arts and Letters also conduct research projects with a variety of research centers. These include the Klau Center for Civil and Human Rights, the De Nicola Center for Ethics and Culture, the Center for Italian Studies, the Center for Research on Educational Opportunity, the Center for the Study of Social Movements, the John J. Reilly Center for Science, Technology, and Values, the Rooney Center for the Study of American Democracy, the William J. Shaw Center for Children and Families, and the Wilson Sheehan Lab for Economic Opportunities.

The College of Arts and Letters is also affiliated with a number of research centers within the university that are dedicated to the furtherance and study of the Catholic categories fundamental to the core values of the University of Notre Dame. Such centers include the Center for Philosophy of Religion, the Center for the Study of Religion and Society, the Center for Theology, Science, and Human Flourishing, and the Cushwa Center for the Study of American Catholicism.

Deans
1919–1923 Joseph Leonard Carrico
1923–1935 Charles C. Miltner
1935–1936 T. Bowyer Campbell
1936–1940 Charles C. Miltner
1940–1943 Francis J. Boland
1943–1951 Francis P. Cavanaugh
1951–1969 Charles E. Sheedy
1969–1975 Frederick J. Crosson
1975–1981 Isabel Charles
1981–1983 Robert E. Burns
1983–1991 Michael J. Loux
1991–1997 Harold W. Attridge
1997–2008 Mark W. Roche
2008–2018 John McGreevy
2018–present Sarah Mustillo

References

External links

College Of Arts And Letters
Liberal arts colleges at universities in the United States
Educational institutions established in 1842
1842 establishments in Indiana